is a national highway connecting Yokkaichi and Osaka in Japan.

Route data
Length: 144.5 km (89.8 mi)
Origin: Yokkaichi (originates at junction with Route 23)
Terminus: Osaka (ends at junction with Routes 1 and 2)
Major cities: Kameyama, Iga, Tenri

History
4 December 1952 - Designated as First Class National Highway 25 (from Osaka to Nara)
18 May 1953 - Designation of Second Class National Highway 163 (from Osaka to Yokkaichi)
1 April 1963 - Designated as First Class National Highway 25 (from Yokkaichi to Osaka)
1 April 1965 -  Second Class National Highway 163 was redesignated as General National Highway 25 between Yokkaichi and Osaka

Intersects with

Mie Prefecture
Nara Prefecture
Osaka Prefecture

References

025
Roads in Mie Prefecture
Roads in Nara Prefecture
Roads in Osaka Prefecture